The École nationale des sciences appliquées de Tétouan (National school of applied sciences of Tetouan) is a public engineering school in Morocco established in September, 2008. The school is located in Tetouan, Morocco. It is part of the National Schools of Applied Sciences-ENSA and Abdelmalek Essaâdi University.

Mission
The school's main goals are:
 training and preparing qualified engineers in an array of engineering disciplines (see below) both theoretically and practically in order to satisfy the needs of economical and social developments both regionally and nationally.
 Advancing scientific and technological researches.
 Establishing a cooperation framework with industrial, socio-economical, and scientific decision makers regionally, nationally,  and internationally.

Programmes offered
Computer Engineering
Telecommunication and Networks Engineering
Mechatronics Engineering
Supply Chain Engineering
Civil Engineering

References

External links
 Site officiel

Education in Morocco
Tétouan
Buildings and structures in Tanger-Tetouan-Al Hoceima